Erwin Redl (born 1963) in Gföhl, Lower Austria is an Austrian-born artist currently living in the United States. As artistic medium, he uses LEDs. His work includes installations, videos, graphics, computerart, and electronic music.

Life and work 
Redl studied electronic music and composition at the University of Music and Performing Arts, Vienna. Then he moved to New York City, where he studied Computer Art at the School of Visual Arts; he graduated in 1995. With his artwork Matrix VI, he lit the face of the Whitney Museum of American Art in New York during the Whitney Biennial 2002. 
His works, some of them are named Matrix, were shown in New York, Germany, France, Austria, and Korea. The installation called Fade I allows visitors to move into lit spaces. This installation was shown in Lille, France, as part of Lille 2004 (fr) - European Capital of Culture, where it animated the Eglise Sainte-Marie Madeleine (fr). 
Erwin Redl's Nocturnal Flow has been installed in the Paul G. Allen Center. The artwork, an 85-foot brick column at the west end of the atrium, was chosen by the Washington State Arts Commission. It was supported by the Washington State's Art in Public Places Program.

Erwin Redl lives and works in New York.

Public Collections 
 ACE GALLERY Los Angeles,
 C3 Budapest, Budapest, Hungary
 Niederösterreichisches Landesmuseum, St. Pölten, Austria

References

External links 
 Official Website
 Biography with an image of the Installation "Nocturnal Flow"
 Erwin Redl in artfacts

Austrian artists
1963 births
Living people
University of Music and Performing Arts Vienna alumni
American digital artists
Postmodern artists
Artists from New York (state)
New media artists
American installation artists
American conceptual artists
American sound artists
American experimental musicians
Experimental composers
Male classical composers
20th-century American composers
20th-century American male musicians